Butantã (from the tupi for "crushed soil") is a district of the city of São Paulo, Brazil. It is part of the homonymous subprefecture, located on the west bank of the Pinheiros River.

The district hosts the main campus of the University of São Paulo.

The Instituto Butantan is also located in the borough.

External links 
 Virtual guide of Butantã

Districts of São Paulo